Buckholts High School or  Buckholts School is a public high school located in Buckholts, Texas, USA. It is part of the Buckholts Independent School District located in northwestern Milam County and classified as a 1A school by the University Interscholastic League. In 2015, the school was rated "Improvement Required" by the Texas Education Agency.

Athletics
The Buckholts Badgers compete in the following sports -

Baseball
Basketball
Cross country
6-man football
Track and field
Volleyball

References

External links
Buckholts ISD

Schools in Milam County, Texas
Public high schools in Texas